The list of Croatian records in swimming shows the fastest performances in the sport of swimming by Croatian nationals. They are ratified and tracked by the Croatian Swimming Federation.

Long course (50 m)

Men

Women

Mixed relay

Short course (25 m)

Men

Women

References
General
Croatian Long Course Records – Men 14 March 2023 updated
Croatian Long Course Records – Women 14 March 2023 updated
Croatian Short Course Records – Men 14 March 2023 updated
Croatian Short Course Records – Women 14 March 2023 updated
Specific

External links
Croatian Swimming Federation
Croatian Swimming Federation records page

Croatia
Records
Swimming records
Swimming